Intervals is the second studio album by See You Next Tuesday. It was set to be released on October 14, but was pushed back to October 21, 2008 by Ferret.

The album shows the band progressing towards an overall death metal sound, rather than continue to showcase the more predominant metalcore influence of their previous releases.

Many of the tracks are under a minute, with the exception of a ten-minute concluding song.

Track listing

References

2008 albums
See You Next Tuesday albums